Bougouni is a village and seat of the commune of Mariko in the Cercle of Niono in the Ségou Region of southern-central Mali. The village lies on the west side of the Fala de Molodo, 19 km north of Niono.

References

Populated places in Ségou Region